Ancoub Mze Ali (born 11 February 1996) is a footballer who plays for the B-team of French club RC Lens and the Comoros national football team.

International career
Mze Ali was born in Nice, France, to Comorian parents. He represented France at the U17 level in 2013.

He debuted for Comoros in a friendly 1–1 draw with Gabon on 15 November 2016.

References

External links
 
 
 OGC Nice Profile 
 
 FootNational Profile

1996 births
Living people
Footballers from Nice
Association football midfielders
Comorian footballers
Comoros international footballers
French footballers
France youth international footballers
French sportspeople of Comorian descent
Championnat National 2 players
Comorian expatriate footballers
Expatriate footballers in France